Filip Dymerski (born 5 April 2002) is a Polish professional footballer who plays as a defender for IV liga club AS Kolbudy.

References

External links

2002 births
Living people
Polish footballers
Poland youth international footballers
Association football defenders
Lechia Gdańsk players
Lechia Gdańsk II players
Bytovia Bytów players
Ekstraklasa players
II liga players
IV liga players